Pelargoderus waigeuensis is a species of beetle in the family Cerambycidae. It was described by Gilmour in 1956. It is known from Moluccas.

References

waigeuensis
Beetles described in 1956